Minutes to Go is an album released by the Danish punk band Sods (later named Sort Sol). It was released in 1979 and is often referred to as Denmark's first punk album. The original album contained eight of the band's own songs and a cover version of Suicide's "Ghost Rider".

The album was re-released in 1997 with six bonus tracks.

Track listing
All songs by Sods (except where noted)
 "R.A.F."
 "Television Sect"
 "Pathetic"
 "Police" (Sods-Camilla Højby, Sods)
 "Flickering Eyes"
 "Suicide"
 "Transport"
 "Copenhagen"
 "Ghost Rider" (Martin Rev, Alan Vega)

1997 re-release bonus tracks
 "Rock'N' Roll"
 "Tin Can People"
 "Military Madness" (Sods-Camilla Højby, Sods)
 "No Ref"
 "Number One"
 "Breathtaking Effects"

Personnel
Sods
 Peter Peter – guitar
 Tomas Ortved – drums
 Knud Odde – bass guitar
 Steen Jørgensen – vocals

Production
 Poul Bruun – production
 Flemming Rasmussen – engineering
 Rapand – engineering

References

Sort Sol albums
1979 debut albums